Virginia Smith Dam (also known as Calamus Dam; National ID # NE02287) is a dam in Garfield County, Nebraska, about five miles northwest of Burwell.

The earthen dam was constructed in 1985 by the United States Bureau of Reclamation with a height of 96 feet and 147 feet long at its crest.  It impounds the Calamus River for irrigation storage and flood control, as part of the North Loup Division of the extensive, multi-state Pick–Sloan Missouri Basin Program.  The dam is owned by the Bureau and is operated by the local Twin Loup Irrigation District.

The reservoir it creates, Calamus Reservoir, has a water surface of 5,142 acres, 6,404 land acres, about 31 miles of shoreline, and a maximum capacity of 27,400 acre-feet.  Recreation includes fishing (walleye, wiper, white bass, northern pike, largemouth bass, rainbow trout, and crappie, etc.), hunting, boating, camping and hiking.  The reservoir is also the site of the state Calamus Reservoir State Recreation Area and Wildlife Management Area. Although the dam itself is located in Garfield County, most of the reservoir lies in Loup County, to its west.

The lake and surrounding public lands are a part of the Calamus State Recreation Area, managed by the Nebraska Game and Parks Commission.

References

External links
Calamus State Recreation Area, Nebraska Game & Parks Commission

Dams in Nebraska
Reservoirs in Nebraska
United States Bureau of Reclamation dams
Buildings and structures in Garfield County, Nebraska
Buildings and structures in Loup County, Nebraska
Earth-filled dams
Dams completed in 1985
Bodies of water of Garfield County, Nebraska
Bodies of water of Loup County, Nebraska